Too Many Cooks is a British cookery competition that aired on ITV1 from 1 November 2004 to 4 September 2005 and hosted by Kate Garraway for the first series and Jeni Barnett for the second series. The judges for the first series were Brian Turner and James Martin while the second series judges were Gino D'Acampo, Richard Phillips and Alex MacKay.

Format
Four teams of two people competitively cook for three judges. Each team is told what to cook and are given ten minutes to cook a starter, twenty minutes to cook a main course, and ten minutes to cook a pudding. A couple is eliminated after each course, leaving two teams to compete at the pudding stage.

Transmissions

External links

2004 British television series debuts
2005 British television series endings
Cooking competitions in the United Kingdom
ITV game shows
Television series by ITV Studios